Armand Hammer is an American hip hop duo from New York City. It consists of Billy Woods and Elucid.

History
In September 2013, Armand Hammer released a mixtape, Half Measures. It was produced by Steel Tipped Dove, Blockhead, Uncommon Nasa, and Small Pro, among others. In October that year, the duo released the first studio album, Race Music, which was produced by the likes of Steel Tipped Dove, Marmaduke, Willie Green, and Blue Sky Black Death. Tiny Mix Tapes called it "a potent record about life, art, sex, drugs, politics, and violence." The Village Voice included it on the "10 Best New York City Rap Albums of 2013" list. On October 25, 2013, "Shark Fin Soup" was included on Spins "Rap Songs of the Week" list.

In 2014, the duo released an EP, Furtive Movements. The Village Voice included it on the "10 Best New York City Rap Albums of 2014" list. In 2017, the duo released a studio album, Rome. Stereogum placed it at number 28 on the "40 Best Rap Albums of 2017" list. In 2018, the duo released a studio album, Paraffin. PopMatters placed it at number 65 on the "70 Best Albums of 2018" list, while Stereogum placed it at number 4 on the "10 Best Rap Albums of 2018" list. It was also included on Pitchforks "Best Rap Albums of 2018" list, as well as The A.V. Clubs "Best Hip-Hop Albums of 2018" list.

In 2020, the duo released a studio album, Shrines. The duo's collaborative studio album with producer the Alchemist, titled Haram, was released in 2021.

Members
 Billy Woods - vocals
 Elucid - vocals, production

Discography

Studio albums
 Race Music (2013)
 Rome (2017)
 Paraffin (2018)
 Shrines (2020)
 Haram (2021)

Compilation albums
 WHT LBL (2022)

Mixtapes
 Half Measures (2013)

EPs
 Furtive Movements (2014)

Guest appearances
 Willie Green - "The Thousand Headed Man" from Doc Savage (2016)
 Zilla Rocca - "Favors Are Bad News" from Future Former Rapper (2018)
 Blockhead - "Be Safe" from Free Sweatpants (2019)
 Bartees Strange - "Free Kelly Rowland" from Live Forever deluxe edition (2020)
 Defcee & Messiah Muzik - "Shortcuts" from Trapdoor (2021)
 Earl Sweatshirt - "Tabula Rasa" from Sick! (2022)
 Open Mike Eagle - "Burner Account" from Component System with the Auto Reverse (2022)
 Defcee & Boathouse - "Rossi" from For All Debts Public and Private (2022)
 Akai Solo - "Upper Room" from Spirit Roaming (2022)
 Pink Siifu & Real Bad Man - "Tokyo Blunts" from Real Bad Flights (2022)

References

External links
 Armand Hammer at Backwoodz Studioz
 

Alternative hip hop groups
American musical duos
Hip hop groups from New York City
2013 establishments in New York City
Musical groups established in 2013